The Martin Model 146 was an unsuccessful American bomber design that lost a 1934–1935 bomber design competition to the prototype for the Douglas B-18 Bolo (itself soon supplanted by the B-17 Flying Fortress).

Design and development
Although generally satisfied with the speed and bombload of the Martin B-10, the United States Army Air Corps expressed a requirement for a bomber with long range. Two competitions were held in 1934–35: one for fast bombers capable of flying , and a second for the experimental prototype of a  bomber.

The Martin 146 was built for the first competition, competing with the Boeing Model 299 (later the B-17) and Douglas DB-1 (later the B-18). Two versions were submitted for the competition, the Model 146 (actual aircraft) and the Model 146A (design only).  The only significance between the two was the planform, the 146 center section was rectangular with the outer wing being tapered while the 146A had a constant taper.

The Model 146 bore a striking resemblance to the earlier Martin B-10, with the same configurations of turret and cockpits and even the same two Wright R-1820 Cyclone engines – albeit with 33% more power than the  Cyclones of the original B-10.  The biggest differences between this aircraft and the Martin 139 (B-10) was that it was wider, allowing the pilot and co-pilot to sit side by side  and was equipped with Fowler flaps, the first large aircraft equipped with them.

The Model 146 was not successful but it led the Martin company to begin research into contemporary aviation technology. Some offshoots included the innovative Martin 145 proposed for the long-range bomber competition as well as the early studies that would lead to the Model 179 (later to emerge as the wartime Martin B-26).  The aircraft was eventually returned to the factory and scrapped.

Specifications (Model 146)

See also

References
Notes

Bibliography

 Baugher, Joe. "Martin B-10". Encyclopedia of American Aircraft. Retrieved: 4 July 2007.
 Taylor, John W. R. "Martin B-10". Combat Aircraft of the World from 1909 to the Present. New York: G.P. Putnam's Sons, 1969. .

External links

 National Museum of the US Air force article on B-10

146
Martin
Mid-wing aircraft
Aircraft first flown in 1935
Twin piston-engined tractor aircraft